Koroglu Rahimov (October 31, 1953, Xaçmaz, Oghuz, Azerbaijan – July 3, 1992, Aghdara, Azerbaijan) was the National Hero of Azerbaijan, the warrior of the First Nagorno-Karabakh War and the Division Commander of the 2nd military division of the military unit "N".

Military activities 
Koroglu Rahimov joined as a volunteer to the National Army on 17 March 1992. He was the commander of the 2nd military division of the military unit "N". He died in the battles for Aghdara district of Karabakh in 1992. Two years after his death, on September 16, 1994, by the decree of Heydar Aliyev, he was posthumously  awarded the title of "National Hero of Azerbaijan." He was buried in the Alley of Martyrs in Baku.

Biography 
Koroglu Rahimov was born on October 31 1953, in Khachmaz village of Oguz region, Azerbaijan. In 1960, he went to Yagublu village secondary school for 7 years.

Awards 
According to the decree of the President of the Republic of Azerbaijan Heydar Aliyev dated September 16, 1994, Koroglu Rahimov was posthumously awarded the title of “National Hero of Azerbaijan”.

References

Sources 

1953 births
1992 deaths
Azerbaijani military personnel
Azerbaijani military personnel of the Nagorno-Karabakh War
Azerbaijani military personnel killed in action
National Heroes of Azerbaijan
20th-century military personnel